Steak tartare or tartar steak is a dish of raw ground (minced) beef. It is usually served with onions, capers, mushrooms, pepper, Worcestershire sauce, and other seasonings, often presented separately, to be added to taste. It is often served topped with a raw egg yolk. It is similar to the Levantine kibbeh nayyeh, the Turkish çiğ köfte, the Korean yukhoe and the widely known Japanese sashimi.

The name tartare is sometimes generalized to other raw meat or fish dishes.

In France, a less-common variant called tartare aller-retour is a mound of mostly raw ground meat lightly seared on both sides.

History

The Tatars and raw meat

A popular caricature of Mongol warriors—called Tatars or Tartars—has them tenderizing meat under their saddles, then eating it raw. This story was popularized by the French chronicler Jean de Joinville in the 13th century, although he never actually encountered Mongols himself and used the story as a way of showing that the Tartars were uncivilized. It is possible that this story was a confusion originating in the use of thin slices of meat to protect saddle sores from further rubbing. This has also been considered as the origin of  pastirma.

Popularization of raw meat in Europe and the United States

In the late 19th century, the Hamburg steak became popular on the menus of many restaurants in the port of New York. This kind of fillet was beef minced by hand, lightly salted, and often smoked, and usually served raw in a dish along with onions and bread crumbs. Hamburg steak gained popularity because of its ease of preparation and decreasing cost. This is evident from its detailed description in some of the most popular cookbooks of the day. Documents show that this preparation style was used by 1887 in some U.S. restaurants and was also used for feeding patients in hospitals; the Hamburg steak was served raw or lightly cooked and was accompanied by a raw egg.

It is not known when the first restaurant recipe for steak tartare appeared. While not providing a clear name, it is possible that the dish was popularized in Paris by restaurateurs who misunderstood Jules Verne's description of "Koulbat" ("...a patty of crushed meat and eggs...") in his 1875 novel Michael Strogoff.

Origins of the name

In the early 20th century, what is now generally known as "steak tartare" was called steak à l'Americaine in Europe. One variation on that dish included serving it with tartar sauce; the 1922 edition of Escoffier's Le Guide Culinaire defines "Steak à la tartare" as "steak à l'Americaine" made without egg yolk, served with tartar sauce on the side. "Steak à la tartare" (literally meaning "served with tartar sauce") was later shortened to "steak tartare" Over time, the distinction between steak à l'Americaine and its tartar-sauce variant disappeared. The 1938 edition of Larousse Gastronomique describes steak tartare as raw ground beef served with a raw egg yolk, without any mention of tartar sauce.

"À la tartare" or simply "tartare" can still mean "served with tartar sauce" for some dishes, mostly fried fish. At the same time, the name "tartare" is also sometimes applied to other dishes of raw meats or fish, such as tuna tartare, introduced in 1975 by the restaurant Le Duc in Paris.

Health concerns 
Health concerns have reduced the popularity of this meat dish in some parts of the world because of the danger of contamination by bacteria and parasites such as Toxoplasma gondii and Taenia saginata.

Bacteria
According to the World Health Organization, when the basic hygienic rules are followed, and fresh meat is used, the risk of bacterial infection is low.  However, in the United States of America, ground beef is not typically sold in the expectation that it will be eaten uncooked.  The process of grinding beef can introduce any surface pathogens into the interior of the meat, where they pose greater danger.  The U.S. Department of Agriculture (USDA) recommends avoiding uncooked ground beef.

Parasites
Toxoplasma gondii is a parasite that may be found in raw or undercooked meat. A multicentre case-control study found inadequately cooked or inadequately cured meat as the main risk factor for toxoplasma infection in all centres. Due to the risk of congenital toxoplasmosis in the fetus, pregnant women are advised not to eat raw meat. Latent toxoplasmosis, which lasts a lifetime, has been shown to cause poorer memory in the infected elderly. Latent toxoplasmosis in adults has been supposed to cause, but not proven to cause, psychological effects and lower IQ in some studies.

Taenia saginata (beef tapeworm) may also be acquired via ingestion of undercooked beef. The tapeworm is transmitted to humans via infectious larval cysts found in cattle. People with taeniasis may not know they have a tapeworm infection because the symptoms are usually mild or nonexistent, but it is still possible to develop cysticercosis.

Regional variations

Europe

Steak tartare is found in many European cuisines.

The Belgian version,  (also known as ), is generally made with mayonnaise and seasoned with capers and fresh herbs. It was formerly made of horse meat. It is usually served with french fries.

In the Czech Republic and Slovakia, steak tartare is found in many restaurants. The meat is ground lean sirloin and has a raw egg yolk in a dimple in the middle. The meat can be premixed with herbs and spices, but usually, the customer is given spices and condiments to add to taste. Steak tartare is typically served with fried wheat rye bread in lard or oil, alternatively, it can be toasted, and raw garlic cloves for rubbing on the bread.

A variant of steak tartare is also present in Danish smørrebrød, where it is served on rugbrød (rye bread) with assorted toppings.

In Sweden, steak tartare, is usually served with raw egg yolk, raw onions, diced pickled beetroot, and capers. In Finland,  is served with raw egg yolk, raw onions, pickled and salted cucumbers, and capers. Variations of the dish include dressing with buttermilk sauce and salmon roe. The (European) Ukrainian version can consist of pickled and salted mushrooms and toasted white bread.

North America
Steak tartare is served at many high-end restaurants in the United States.

In Wisconsin, a variation of a steak tartare sandwich called a "cannibal sandwich" is popular among the descendants of German immigrants; it uses sirloin, rye bread, salt, pepper, and chopped onions.

A popular street food in Mexico, Carne Tártara or Carne Apache is a dish of ground beef cured in lime juice, like a ceviche.

South America
Chilean cuisine features a dish of prepared raw beef called crudos.

In southern Brazil, influenced by German immigrants, it is known as Hackepeter or Carne de Onça in Curitiba, where this dish is very common and served covered with chives.

Africa 
Ethiopians have long eaten a dish of raw, minced beef called kitfo.

See also 

 Basashi – Japan, horse meat
 Carpaccio – Italy, beef
 Çiğ köfte – Turkey
 Crudo – Chile
 Gored gored – Ethiopia
 Hamburger – United States, beef
 Kibbeh nayyeh – Levant
 Kitfo – Ethiopia
 Koi – Laos-Thailand
 Larb – Laos-Thailand
 List of beef dishes
 List of steak dishes
 Mett or hackepeter – Germany, pork
 Salmon tartare
 Sushi and sashimi – Japan, seafood
 Yukhoe – Korea

References

Bibliography
 Linda Stradley, I'll Have What They're Having: Legendary Local Cuisine, Falcon, 2002
 
 Raymond Sokolov, How to Cook, revised edition 2004, p. 41 at Google Books
 Albert Jack, What Caesar Did for My Salad: Not to Mention the Earl's Sandwich, Pavlova's Meringue and Other Curious Stories Behind Our Favourite Food, 2010, p. 141 at Google Books

External links

 Steak Tartare. The New York Times.

Uncooked meat dishes
Raw beef dishes
French cuisine
Belgian cuisine
Swedish cuisine
Danish cuisine
Finnish cuisine
Czech cuisine
Polish cuisine
Hungarian cuisine
Slovak cuisine
Ukrainian cuisine
American cuisine
Ground meat
Potentially dangerous food
Raw egg dishes